An Ethernet train backbone (ETB) is a train communication network based on Ethernet technology standardised with IEC-61375-2-5. This is a train-wide communication backbone such as Wire Train Bus (WTB).

Notes and references

See also 
 Ethernet consist network (ECN)

External links 

Industrial Ethernet
Network topology
Networking standards
Ethernet standards